Ashraf Khan is a Pakistani comic actor who has been working on radio, stage, and television since the 1960s. He is best known for his comedy characters in the TV serial Fifty Fifty (1978 – 1984).

Life and career
Born in Lahore, Khan started his career at Radio Pakistan Lahore, as a child artist in the mid-1960s. There he found Mirza Sultan Baig as his mentor. Later, he moved to Karachi in the early 1970s. His debut drama at PTV Karachi center was Uncle Urfi (1972). But a real breakthrough came when he joined the team of the TV comedy show Fifty Fifty, which was aired from 1978 to 1984. His self-created spoofs of famous film songs were a popular part of the show. After Fifty Fifty, he worked in a number of TV plays. Some of his notable dramas include Janjal Pura (1997), Family Front (1997), Double Sawaari (2008), Bulbulay (2009), Dugdugi (2011), Halla Gulla (2015), and others.

Filmography

TV
 Fifty Fifty
 Janjal Pura
 Family Front
 Bulbulay
 Dugdugi
 Gharana Fasanaa
 Muhabbat Yun Bh Hoti Hai
 Khandaan
 Double Sawaari
 Gharoor
 Kalo Kabbabi
 Sayebaan
 Coffee House
 Dil e Naaz
 Excuse Me
 Naya Qanoon
 Jangloos
 Ye Laga Sixer
 Afsar Bekaar e Khaas
 Total Siyapaa
 Mazaaq Raat
 Aap Ka Khadim

Films
 Halla Gulla (2015)

References

20th-century births
Pakistani male comedians
Pakistani male television actors
People from Lahore
Year of birth missing (living people)
Living people